Inferuncus infesta is a moth of the family Pterophoridae. The species was first described by Edward Meyrick in 1934 as Platyptilia infesta. It occurs on São Tomé Island off the western equatorial coast of Central Africa. It was placed in the genus Inferuncus in 2011.

References

Platyptiliini
Endemic moths of São Tomé and Príncipe
Moths described in 1934
Taxa named by Edward Meyrick